Fresh Sound, or Fresh Sound New Talent, is a jazz record label established in Barcelona, Spain, by Jordi Pujol. The label was initially founded as a reissue label.

The catalog includes work by musicians both major and minor that was recorded before 1962, including Louis Armstrong, Duke Ellington, and Charlie Parker. Sources include Argo, Dawn, Prestige/New Jazz, RCA, Royal Roost, Riverside, and Verve. Fresh Sound has released music by obscure singers Jane Fielding, Beverly Kenney, Marilyn Moore, Lucy Ann Polk, and Helyne Stewart

In the early 1990s, the label began to produce new recordings. This included music by Georges Arvanitas and David Murray; Mundell Lowe and Tete Montoliu; Gabe Baltazar, Eddie Bert, Bob Cooper, Dick Hafer, Charlie Mariano, J. R. Monterose, Bill Perkins, Frank Strazzeri, and Claude Williamson. The Fresh Sound New Talent label was inaugurated in the 1990s with the work of Vinny Golia.

Roster

 Pablo Ablanedo
 David Ambrosio
 Reid Anderson
 Bruce Arkin
 Omer Avital
 Gorka Benitez
 Max Bennett
 The Bad Plus
 Seamus Blake
 Albert Bover
 Marlon Browden
 Carme Canela
 Steve Cardenas
 Chris Cheek
 Avishai Cohen
 George Colligan
 Sonny Criss
 Alexis Cuadrado
 Ronnie Cuber
 Eli Degibri
 Daniel Freedman
 Johnny Glasel
 Robert Glasper
 Joe Gordon
 Phil Grenadier
 Lars Gullin
 Dick Hafer
 Amos Hoffman
 Ron Horton
 Ethan Iverson
 Michael Kanan
 Chris Lightcap
 Agnar Magnusson
 Rebecca Martin
 Bill McHenry
 Ryan Meagher
 Brad Mehldau
 Stephane Mercier
 Paul Moer
 Pat Moran McCoy
 Lanny Morgan
 Simon Moullier
 Jack Nimitz
 Hod O'Brien
 Michael Oien
 Vardan Ovsepian
 Charles Owens
 Marty Paich
 Roberta Piket
 Noah Preminger
 Andrew Rathbun
 Matt Renzi
 Pete Robbins
 Kurt Rosenwinkel
 Jorge Rossy
 Perico Sambeat
 Walter Smith III
 Grant Stewart
 Frank Strazzeri
 Marcus Strickland
 Nat Su
 Ben Waltzer
 David Weiss
 Sebastian Weiss
 Scott Wendholt
 Claude Williamson
 David Xirgu
 Miguel Zenon
 Oscar Peñas

References

External links
   
 Official site
 JazzWax Interview with Jordi Pujol

Jazz record labels
Reissue record labels